Edward Burton (August 13, 1939 – May 28, 2012) was an American basketball player from Muskegon Heights, Michigan. In 2016, he was voted the best high school basketball player to come out of Muskegon County.

He played collegiately for Michigan State University.

He played for the New York Knicks (1961–62) and St. Louis Hawks (1964–65) in the NBA for 15 games.

References

External links

1939 births
2012 deaths
Allentown Jets players
American men's basketball players
Basketball players from Arkansas
Forwards (basketball)
Michigan State Spartans men's basketball players
New York Knicks players
St. Louis Hawks players
Undrafted National Basketball Association players